Paul Capdeville was the defending champion, but he was eliminated by Franco Ferreiro in the second round.
Thomaz Bellucci defeated Nicolás Lapentti 6–4, 6–4 in the final match.

Seeds

Draw

Finals

Top half

Bottom half

References
 Main Draw
 Qualifying Draw

Copa Petrobras Sao Paulo - Singles
Copa Petrobras São Paulo